State Route 67 (SR 67) is a northeast–southwest state highway in the U.S. state of Ohio.  Its western terminus is at an interchange with U.S. Route 33 (US 33) just south of Wapakoneta, which is also the southern terminus for both SR 198 and SR 501, and its northern terminus is at SR 18 and SR 19 in Republic. The portion of the route through Seneca County is signed north-south, while the rest of the route is signed east-west.

Route description

The portion of SR 67 in Wayne Township, Auglaize County, beginning at Santa Fe Line Road, passing into Waynesfield to its merge with SR 196, then leaving Waynesfield and ending at its split from SR 196, is designated as the "Staff Sgt. Sonny Zimmerman Memorial Highway", in honor of a Waynesfield resident and Waynesfield-Goshen High School graduate who was killed in Mushaka, Afghanistan on July 16, 2013, while serving in the Army.

History

1924 – Original route established.  Originally routed from Wapakoneta to Bellevue along its current alignment and along State Route 18 from Republic to Bellevue.
1926 – Truncated at Republic; alignment to Bellevue certified as State Route 18.

Major junctions

References

067
Ohio State Route 067
Transportation in Auglaize County, Ohio
Transportation in Hardin County, Ohio
Transportation in Wyandot County, Ohio
Transportation in Seneca County, Ohio